is a 2006 anime series produced by Ajia-do Animation Works, initially based on the story within a story Kujibiki Unbalance that originated from Shimoku Kio's manga Genshiken. It is directed by Tsutomu Mizushima and written by Michiko Yokote. It aired in Kids Station in Japan from October 6 to December 22, 2006.

Notably different from the Genshiken version, it features redesigned characters and a new, yet familiar plot line. A manga adaptation was drawn by Keito Koume and was serialized in Kodansha's Afternoon magazine from April 2007 to December 2007

History
This version of Kujibiki Unbalance has its roots, as with the original, in Genshiken. Within the Genshiken universe, Kujibiki Unbalance (without the heart) is a popular manga serialized in Kudansha's Weekly Shōnen Magazine, written by Yuu Kuroki. This manga, in turn, spawns a 26-episode anime adaptation focusing on the initial "Student Body Tournament" arc, which airs some time during Kanji Sasahara's first two years at Shiiou University. Despite the Genshiken's interest in the anime, fans complain that the tone of the series is uneven: the two halves are handled by two different directors, there is shoddy animation quality in several key episodes, and the conclusion, aside from never airing during the broadcast run, doesn't actually conclude anything. As a result, the reception of the series is mixed at best. Later on, a new anime series is announced. Instead of picking up where the previous series left off, however, it is a complete re-imagining of the story, with new character designs and a story independent of the manga. (This situation parallels that of the Negima! anime, whose successor, Negima!?, takes the series in a completely different direction.) This is that series.

In the real world, the anime version of Kujibiki Unbalance that appeared within Genshiken was made into a 3-episode OVA, made up of episodes 1, 21, and 25 of the supposed 26-episode series; that was all that was made for this version of the anime. The second Kujibiki Unbalance TV series was first announced as "Genshiken season 2" by Media Factory Inc. at Comiket 69. This was later clarified in May 2006, as a 12-episode Kujibiki Unbalance series. Nevertheless, the DVD releases of this series do each include an OVA episode of Genshiken, for a total of 3 new episodes. In addition to the anime, a manga version ran in Kodansha's monthly Afternoon magazine, while a two-volume light novel series was released in late 2006 and early 2007.

Plot

At the gigantic and prestigious Rikkyouin academy the position of everyone in school is determined through a lottery. The school is ruled by the student council headed by the president who wears a giant helmet as a symbol of status. The anime follows the adventure of the four people who drew the lottery tickets to become next years student council. They must complete a variety of tasks set before them by the current student council, with failure resulting in immediate expulsion. The tasks will usually be of a mundane nature, but will inevitably end up in a dramatic fashion involving robots, aliens, terrorists, spies and so forth.

Characters

Next Term's Student Council

 
 The series protagonist. Up until his entrance into high school, he had always had miserable luck, being plagued by rain showers, getting left behind by others, falling into ditches, stepping on dog feces, etc. At the entrance lottery, however, he ends up becoming a candidate for the next term's Student Council President. Shortly after, his luck changes for the better, and he becomes capable of feats of incredible odds. 5 years earlier, he lost his parents in a traffic accident, and as such, he lives together with his sister Shinobu. As a result, he is skilled at doing all kinds of housework.
 

 
 Chihiro's childhood friend, who ends up becoming a candidate for the next term's Student Council Vice-President alongside Chihiro. She has had good luck since birth, not once having had the bad fortune to be caught in a rainshower or just barely miss the train. She has gone through life on luck and intuition alone, so she carries with her a deep faith in luck, as well as a (perhaps groundless) self-confidence and innocence.
 

 
 Candidate for next term's Student Council Secretary. She may be small in stature, but she is a domineering, brazen, vainglorious mad scientist. Because of this fact, she is frequently seen wearing a white lab coat. She treats Kaoruko like a slave, and produces a variety of questionable inventions, such as the mecha used in episode 1. While annoyed at having to work as a team (not to mention the dispositions of her team members), Renko proves on many occasions to be an integral member of the group. She also loves pandas.
 

 
 A student at Rikkyoin Academy's Elementary School division. She is extremely shy and introverted, but also very determined. Her house is located right next to the school, and she lives with her sister Komaki, who runs the noodle shop "Umeya" for the student clientele. She has psychic powers triggered by moments of extreme emotional stress, which she tries to keep secret from others; this contributes to her isolation from her peers. With the help of Chihiro, however, she may be coming out of her shell just a bit.

Current Student Council
 
 The current Student Council President. Taking pride in the greatest luck and intellect in the history of the school, she is said to possess the most valuable leadership skills and charisma in generations. She is half-Japanese: her father is a German with noble blood, and a CEO of a major company; her mother is Japanese. She is a childhood friend of Chihiro's, and lives in his neighborhood.
 

 
 The current Student Council Vice-President who lives at a shrine. Despite her gentle demeanor and a feminine bearing she is extremely powerful. She wields a sword but rarely draws it, has martial art skills enabling her to effortlessly defeat Renko's creations, and can use magical Shikigami powers to create paper copies of herself.
 

 
 The current Student Council Treasurer. She appears rough, but she makes very precise calculations. She is a good-hearted, sociable, cheerful American girl. She seems impoverished, and lives such a lifestyle. According to some reports, she has 10-figure entries in her bank book, but it cannot be verified.
 

 Alex
The current Student Council Secretary, he is a golden retriever. He is the fourth Student Council member, and it is not known how he became the secretary.

Others
 
 Kaoruko is Renko's "assistant" and thus always at her side. She is relentlessly upbeat and often tries to smooth over Renko's temper by putting her outbursts into more tactful form; nevertheless, she receives a fair amount of abuse when her attitude conflicts with Renko's serious, aloof demeanor. Kaoruko also figures heavily in a variety of Renko's inventions, often as the brains of whatever device has been created for the occasion. (While it not stated outright at first, it becomes clear that Kaoruko herself is actually an android, which explains why she interfaces so easily with Renko's other inventions.)
 

 
 Chihiro's older sister and a teacher at the academy. She is well liked by her students and has the outer appearance of a lovable person. In reality she is both mean and violent with a past of being the leader of a gang of delinquents, she also dreams of having an incestuous relationship with her brother. Chihiro is completely oblivious of this.
 

 
 Koyuki's older sister and a student at the academy. She is the manager of a small noodle shop that becomes the main characters favorite spot to hang out after school. Her secret identity is the leader of the R3S special security service that protects the academy against inner and outer enemies.

Media

Anime
The series first aired in Kids Station from October 6 to December 22, 2006. Saori Atsumi performed the series's opening theme  while both Ai Nonaka and Ami Koshimizu performed the series ending theme "Harmonies". Like Genshiken, AnimeWorks licensed the series in North American territories.

Manga
Keito Koume draw and wrote the manga adaptation of the series and was serialized in Kodansha's Afternoon magazine from April 2007 to December 2007. The plot of the manga roughly follows that of the anime, though there are some deviations, as noted below. Additionally, each volume of the manga adaptation also includes a bonus manga at the end, drawn by Shimoku Kio himself and featuring the characters from Genshiken at approximately the same time (in-universe) as the volume was originally released.

Video game
Kujibiki Unbalance: Kaichō Onegai Smash Fight is a video game developed by Marvelous Entertainment and Shade, and published by Marvelous Interactive on January 25, 2007. The game received a score of 20/40 from Famitsu, the lowest rated game of that week.

Notes

References

External links
 [https//web.archive.org/web/20070507104948/http://www.kujian.info/ Official Kujibiki Unbalance Homepage]
Genco page

2006 Japanese novels
Ajia-do Animation Works
Animated television series reboots
Anime spin-offs
Del Rey Manga
Fictional television shows
Kids Station original programming
Kodansha manga
Light novels
MF Bunko J
Seinen manga